The Treasure of Nagyszentmiklós is an important hoard of 23 early medieval gold vessels, in total weighing 9.945 kg (about 22 lbs), found in 1799 near Nagyszentmiklós, Kingdom of Hungary (today Sânnicolau Mare, Romania), meaning "Great St Nicholas". After the excavation, the treasure was transferred to Vienna, the dynastic capital of the Habsburg Monarchy. Ever since, it has been in the possession of the Kunsthistorisches Museum there, where it is on permanent display.

A wide range of views continue to be held as to the dating and the origins of the styles of the pieces, and the context in which they were made, which may well vary between the pieces. Unusually, the inscriptions on some pieces have increased the complexity of the arguments rather than reduced them.  In 2008 Romanian officials asked the Austrian government for the treasure's repatriation.

In the 19th century the treasure was widely regarded in Hungary as originating with precursors of the Hungarian people, and played a notable part as an icon of Hungarian nationalism.  In particular the gold cup with a bull's head facing back over the bowl was known as the "Cup of Attila" - Attila the Hun having died in  453.

The treasure, consisting of 23 gold vessels and variously dated from the 6th to the 10th century, was found on 3 July 1799 by Neru Vuin, a Serbian peasant farmer, in the vicinity of Nagyszentmiklós (Sânnicolau Mare). The figure of the "victorious Prince" dragging a prisoner along by his hair (see figure on the right) and the mythological scene at the back of the golden jar, as well as the design of other ornamental objects, show close affinities with finds at Novi Pazar, Bulgaria and at Sarkel, Russia. Stylistically, Central Asian, Persian-Sassanid and Byzantine influences are predominant.

Inscriptions

On one of the vessels in the hoard there is an inscription written in the Greek alphabet which reads:

ΒΟΥΗΛΑ.ΖΟΑΠΑΝ.ΤΕΣΗ.ΔΥΓΕΤΟΙΓΗ.ΒΟΥΤΑΟΥΛ.ΖΩΑΠΑΝ.ΤΑΓΡΟΓΗ.ΗΤΖΙΓΗ.ΤΑΙΣΗ
(Transliteration: bouēla zoapan tesē dygetoigē boutaoul zōapan tagrogē ētzigē taisē)

Today almost all scholars share the view that the text is written in a Turkic language, but it has not been deciphered and the exact classification of the language has been a subject of debate. It has been often compared with the Turkic Bulgar language of the First Bulgarian Empire, attested on several 8th-9th century inscriptions written in Greek letters. More recently Eugene Helimski argued the language is close to Proto-Tungusic, but this proposal was rejected by Marcel Erdal as far-fetched.

There is another inscription in the Greek language. Also, there are several other very short inscriptions in a runiform script which are also likely to be in a Turkic language, but these are very brief and also have not been deciphered.

Cultural context

The cultural milieu or milieux in which the objects in the treasure were created, assembled and deposited remains controversial, with the debate often influenced by nationalistic concerns.

Avar
Scholars have connected the treasure with the Avar Khaganate. The newest research shows it is closely related to the Avar culture.

Byzantin
According to a Greek text of a vessel, the treasure may have a Byzantine Empire origin. In a study of a Romanian scientist, the text of a vessel has to be read as ΔEA[=ΔIA] YΔATOC ANAΠΛYΣON A<YT˃ON EIC PHTON[=PEITON] OMAYLON. Meaning: "With water clean it [the disc] in the neighboring [sacred] stream". Also, he wrote the treasure belonged to Ahtum, a voivode of Banat.

Magyar or Bulgar
As noted above, close affinities have been recognized between the Nagyszentmiklós material and that found at Novi Pazar and in Khazaria. Archaeologists in both Hungary and Bulgaria consider these affinities to support theories of ancient migration between regions. Both were allied with Khazars for a period. The treasure gives some idea of the art of the First Bulgarian Empire, Hungarian and Khazar states. According to Professor Nykola Mavrodinov (based on Vilhelm Thomsen), the script on vessel number 21 is in Bulgar, written in Greek letters, surrounding a cross, and reads, "Boyla Zoapan made this vessel. Butaul Zoapan intended it for drinking."

Khazar
One school of Hungarian archaeologists maintains that the tenth century gold- and silversmiths working in Hungary were Khazar. When the Magyars migrated to Pannonia in 896, some Khazar tribes, known as the Khavars, came with them to their new homes. The Khavars were skilled gold and silversmiths.

Persian
Khazar art is believed to be modelled on Persian-Sassanide art patterns. The Soviet archaeologist O. H. Bader emphasized the role of the Khazars in the spread of Persian-style silverware towards the north. Some of these works may have been re-exported by the Khazars, as middlemen; others were imitations made in Khazar workshops, ruins of which have been found near the ancient Khazar fortress of Sarkel. The Swedish archaeologist T. J. Arne mentions ornamental plates, clasps and buckles of Sassanide and Byzantine inspiration, manufactured in Khazaria or territories under their influence, being found as far afield as Sweden. Thus, the Khazars, Magyars and Bulgars could have been intermediaries in spreading Persian-Sassanide art in Eastern Europe.

See also
 Scythian art
 The Avar Treasure
 Pereshchepina Treasure
 Preslav Treasure
 Rhyton
 Griffin
 Simurgh/Simorgh
 Garuda
 Sasanian art
 Oxus Treasure
 Ganymede (mythology)

References

External links
 Kunsthistorisches Museum, Vienna
 THE GOLDEN TREASURE OF THE BULGARIAN KHANS FROM ATTILA TO SIMEON (in English)
 THE GOLDEN TREASURE OF THE BULGARIAN KHANS FROM ATTILA TO SIMEON  (in Bulgarian)

Art and cultural repatriation
Nagyszentmiklos, treasure of
Nagyszentmiklos, treasure of
History of Banat
Nagyszentmiklos, treasure of
Collections of the Kunsthistorisches Museum
1799 archaeological discoveries